Thornthwaite is a village in Cumbria, England. Historically in Cumberland, it is just off the A66 road, south of Bassenthwaite Lake and within the Lake District National Park. In 1861 the township had a population of 153.

For administrative purposes, Thornthwaite lies within the civil parish of Above Derwent, the district of Allerdale, and the county of Cumbria. It is within the Copeland constituency of the United Kingdom Parliament. Prior to Brexit in 2020 it was part of the North West England constituency of the European Parliament.

St Mary's Church is located a short distance east of the village. It was built in 1831, replacing an earlier church of c.1760 on the same site. The Church is a Grade II listed building.

References

External links
 Cumbria County History Trust: Above Derwent (nb: provisional research only – see Talk page)

Villages in Cumbria
Allerdale